Mohammad Matiur Rahman (1 November 1947 – 14 September 2012) was a cardiac surgeon and Bangladesh Awami League politician. He was a Jatiya Sangsad member representing Tangail-3 constituency.

Education and career
Rahman passed MBBS from Mymensingh Medical College in 1972 and received the PhD from University of Iowa in 1994.

Rahmad served as the director of Labaid Cardiac Hospital in Dhaka.

References

1947 births
2012 deaths
Awami League politicians
9th Jatiya Sangsad members
Place of birth missing
Bangladeshi cardiac surgeons
University of Iowa alumni